Trifolium spadiceum is a species of flowering plant belonging to the family Fabaceae.

Its native range is Europe to Western Siberia and Iran.

Synonyms:
 Chrysaspis spadicea (L.) Greene
 Trifolium litigiosum Desv.

References

spadiceum